Landmark Entertainment Group is a global entertainment design firm based in Los Angeles, California, United States, that creates theme parks, theme park attractions, live entertainment productions, and virtual reality attractions. Co-founded by Gary Goddard and Tony Christopher in 1980, it created Caesars Palace, and also became known for producing attractions at the Universal Studios theme parks, including The Amazing Adventures of Spider-Man, Jurassic Park: The Ride, and Terminator 2: 3D.

It has created themed attractions in over 35 countries on five continents, as well as concept and master plans for complete destination resorts, redevelopment areas, and mixed-use retail and entertainment facilities. Its previous projects include TV productions and movies, and original properties for animation.

Virtual reality

The L.I.V.E. Centre

Announced in June 2015
, The Landmark Interactive Virtual Experience (L.I.V.E. Centre) is a virtual reality and augmented reality concept that will be created in a Chinese city in the summer of 2017. This first 200,000 square foot installation will feature traditional theme park attractions, such as an interactive museum, virtual zoo, aquarium, live theatre, 4D theatre, and art gallery, with 30% of its experiences expected to contain virtual reality content.

Pavilion Of Me™

In October 2015, Landmark announced the company's concept of the Pavilion Of Me™(P.O.M), a daily-use in-home entertainment portal that reimagines everyday activities such as checking social media, online shopping, watching film and TV content, video chat, and playing video games into virtual reality experiences.

Virtual World’s Fair

In conjunction with the Pavilion of Me™, the concept for the Virtual World's Fair™ was also announced—a virtual reality experience including real-time social interaction, entertainment, education and shopping, like a traditional world's fair, but designed for in-home use rather than as a real-world destination.

Completed projects

 Source A is: place holder 1

References

Companies based in Los Angeles